Yohann Ploquin (born 1978) is a French team handball player. He competed at the 2004 Summer Olympics in Athens, where the French team placed fifth.

References

External links

1978 births
Living people
French male handball players
Olympic handball players of France
Handball players at the 2004 Summer Olympics